Kacper Przybyłko (born 25 March 1993) is a professional footballer who plays as a striker for Chicago Fire in Major League Soccer. Born in Germany, he represented Poland at various youth international levels.

Club career

1. FC Köln
On 31 January 2012, Przybyłko joined 1. FC Köln's reserve team from Arminia Bielefeld.

Greuther Fürth
After the end of his loan to Bielefeld in summer 2014, he left 1. FC Köln to join Greuther Fürth on a three-year deal until 2017. He was described as tough and good on the ball.

1. FC Kaiserslautern
Przybyłko joined 1. FC Kaiserslautern in July 2015 and scored two goals in his debut for the club. In summer 2018 he was released by the club.

In August 2018, he trialled with 1. FC Magdeburg of the 2. Bundesliga.

Philadelphia Union

On 16 September 2018, Przybyłko signed with Philadelphia Union competing in Major League Soccer for the remainder of the 2018 season with an option for 2019. Despite not making an appearance for the Union in 2018, his option was picked up ahead of the 2019 season. After a brief loan to Bethlehem Steel to recover from a foot injury, Przybyłko made his debut for the Union as a substitute against the Montreal Impact. A week later, he scored his first goal for the Union as an equalizer against Vancouver Whitecaps FC. Przybyłko continued to become a scoring threat over the season, leading the Union's scoring with 15 goals before suffering an injury and keeping him out for the post-season.

2019 season: Loan to Bethlehem Steel
Prior to the start of the 2019 season, Przybyłko was loaned to the Union's affiliate, Bethlehem Steel FC, who compete in the USL Championship. Przybyłko started in the opening match away against Birmingham Legion FC and scored the first goal of Steel FC's season.

Chicago Fire
On 22 January 2022, Przybyłko was traded to Chicago Fire in exchange for $1,150,000 of General Allocation Money.

International career
Przybyłko played for the Poland national U21 team.

Personal life
Born in Bielefeld, Kacper Przybyłko comes from a sporting family of Polish origin. His twin brother, Jakub, is also a footballer who joined Greuther Fürth in 2014, and later played for the second team in fourth-tier Regionalliga Bayern. His older brother Mateusz Przybylko is a high jumper representing Germany in international competitions.

Career statistics

Club

Honours
Philadelphia Union
Supporters' Shield: 2020

Individual
CONCACAF Champions League Golden Boot: 2021
CONCACAF Champions League Team of the Tournament: 2021

References

External links
 
 

1993 births
Living people
Sportspeople from Bielefeld
Footballers from North Rhine-Westphalia
Association football forwards
Polish footballers
Citizens of Poland through descent
Poland youth international footballers
Poland under-21 international footballers
German footballers
German people of Polish descent
Arminia Bielefeld players
1. FC Köln players
1. FC Köln II players
SpVgg Greuther Fürth players
1. FC Kaiserslautern players
Philadelphia Union players
Philadelphia Union II players
Chicago Fire FC players
2. Bundesliga players
3. Liga players
Regionalliga players
USL Championship players
Major League Soccer players
Polish expatriate footballers
Polish expatriate sportspeople in Germany
Polish expatriate sportspeople in the United States
German expatriate footballers
German expatriate sportspeople in the United States